

Fossils
 A unpublished catalogue of the fossil collection belonging to curiosity dealer Joshua Platt is compiled. A notable inclusion was a partial Megalosaurus thigh bone that Platt discovered in 1758. However, this fossil has been lost.

References

18th century in paleontology
Paleontology